A 3 turn is a figure skating element which involves both a change in direction and a change in edge. For example, when a skater executes a forward outside 3 turn, the skater begins on a forward outside edge and finishes on a backwards inside edge. There are eight 3 turns in all: one for each possible combination of direction (forward or backward), skating foot (left or right), and edge (inside or outside).

The turn is named for the tracing that it makes on the ice. Each edge makes a curve, and the change of edge in between them is marked by a point. It looks roughly like the number three. When skaters joined two circles on either foot, it created a tracing that looked like the number 8. These tracings inspired skaters in Holland and throughout Europe to develop methods of carving other numbers and letters of the alphabet in the ice, as well as, among more accomplished skaters, writing their own names and drawing elaborate patterns.

3 turns are considered basic turns in figure skating. Along with mohawk turns, they are the first one-foot turns (where only one foot is on the ice during the entry, exit and turn) learned by beginning skaters, and the most common way for skaters to change direction. 3 turns can also be used as the common entrance to a toe loop jump and the flip jump.

References 

Figure skating elements